Morris Branch is a  long 2nd order tributary to the Hyco River in Halifax County, Virginia.

Course
Morris Branch rises at Moffett, Virginia and then flows north to join the Hyco River about 0.5 miles north-northwest of Aarons Creek.

Watershed
Morris Branch drains  of area, receives about 45.3 in/year of precipitation, has a wetness index of 430.34, and is about 49% forested.

See also
List of rivers of Virginia

References

Rivers of Virginia
Rivers of Halifax County, Virginia
Tributaries of the Roanoke River